Geshe Lharampa Jinpa Sonam is a Tibetan Buddhist philosopher and Spiritual Director for the Indiana Buddhist Center. Sonam was born on May 25, 1955, in Zanskar valley, Ladakh, in the Republic of India.  In 1967, he became a monk at the Stagrimo Gompa, a Drukpa Kagyu monastery in Ladakh near Padum.  He studied at this monastery for six years before joining the Drepung Gomang Monastery, a Gelugpa monastery in Mundgod, Karnataka India as a novice monk.

In 1999, he passed the Gelugpa Board Examination and was awarded the Lharampa Geshe degree.  That same year he was sent to the Tibetan Cultural Center in Bloomington, Indiana, with three other monks to teach Buddhism. After a brief return to India, he returned to the United States to serve as a resident teacher at the Gomang Meditation and Dharma Center in Independence, Kentucky prior to returning to Indiana to found the Indiana Buddhist Center.

References

External links
 Indiana Buddhist Center Website

Geshes
Tibetan Buddhist spiritual teachers
Tibetan Buddhist monks
Gelug Buddhists
1955 births
Living people